Gloria María Borrero (born 1956) is a Colombian politician who served as Minister of Justice from 2018 to 2019.

References 

1956 births
Living people
21st-century Colombian women politicians
21st-century Colombian politicians
Ministers of Justice and Law of Colombia
Colombian politicians
Colombian women lawyers
Female justice ministers
20th-century Colombian lawyers